Chaillou is a French surname. Notable people with the surname include:

Antoine-Jean Amelot de Chaillou (1732–1795), French politician
Auguste Chaillou (1866–1915), French biologist and physician
Jean-Jacques Amelot de Chaillou (1689–1749), French politician
Narcisse Chaillou (1835–1916), French painter
Timothée Chaillou, French art curator and critic

French-language surnames